Le Magnétiseur, sold in the United States as A Hypnotist at Work and in Britain as While Under a Hypnotist's Influence, was an 1897 French short silent film by Georges Méliès. It was sold by Méliès's Star Film Company and is numbered 129 in its catalogues.

The film is one of a small group of risqué "mature subjects" (i.e. stag films) Méliès made around this time; others included Peeping Tom at the Seaside, A Private Dinner, and After the Ball. A Hypnotist at Work is currently presumed lost.

References

External links
 

French black-and-white films
Films directed by Georges Méliès
French silent short films
Lost French films
1890s lost films
1897 short films
1890s French films